En passant is a 1997 album recorded by the French singer-songwriter Jean-Jacques Goldman. The CD was produced between April and August 1997 in collaboration with Erick Benzi at the Kevin Mobile, Mega and Gimmick studios, and was released on the Columbia/Sony BMG record label on 26 August 1997.

Album information
The CD uses the HDCD format, which improves the quality of the audio (compared to regular CDs) when played back in a suitable player. The album is intimate and contains acoustic and blues melodies. It mainly deals with death ("On ira", "En passant") and love ("Sache que je", "Quand tu danses", "Les Murailles").

The album went straight to number one on the SNEP albums chart in France and remained for 82 weeks in the top 200. In Belgium (Wallonia), it also debuted at number one and totaled 65 weeks on the chart. It was only ranked for ten weeks in Switzerland, but earned a Platinum disc. It was less successful in Belgium (Flanders) where it stayed for six weeks on the charts (top 50).

The album provided three singles, but only the first one was a hit : "Sache que je" reached No. 19 in France and No. 18 in Belgium (Wallonia), while the other two singles ("Quand tu danses" and "Bonne idée") failed to enter the top 50 (#66 and No. 68 in France).

Track listing
All tracks written, composed and performed by Goldman.
 "Sache que je" – 5:25
 "Bonne idée" – 3:27
 "Tout était dit" – 4:18
 "Quand tu danses" – 4:25
 "Le coureur" – 4:14
 "Juste quelques hommes" – 4:44
 "Nos mains" – 3:18
 "Natacha" – 3:01
 "Les murailles" – 2:28
 "On ira" – 4:25
 "En passant" – 7:18

Personnel
 Jean-Jacques Goldman – guitar, vocals
 Erick Benzi – engineer
 Claude Gassian – photography
 Alexis Grosbois – coordination

Release history

Certifications and sales

Charts

References

1997 albums
Jean-Jacques Goldman albums
Albums produced by Erick Benzi